100% Lena was released in 2002 and is a compilation album by Swedish pop singer Lena Philipsson.

Track listing
"Kärleken är evig"
"Om igen"
"Saknar dig innan du går"
"Jag känner" ("Ti Sento")
"Det går väl an"
"Cheerio"
"Åh Amadeus"
"Månsken i augusti"
"Dansa i neon"
"Du är mitt liv"
"Stjärnorna"
"Löpa linan ut"
"Den ende"
"Åh, vad jag längtar"
"Sommartid"
"Om jag fick"
"Kom du av dej"
"Säg det nu"
"Segla"
"Boy"

References

2002 greatest hits albums
Lena Philipsson compilation albums
Swedish-language compilation albums